Mr. 3 Minutes is a 2006 Hong Kong film directed by Gordon Chan.

Premise
Thirty-two-year-old Scott is the son of a rich businessman, who runs a modern bridal salon. Scott is a hedonistic gentleman and a lot of ladies are willing to surrender themselves to him. He's the most sought-after bachelor in town but he does not want to be held down by marriage or a family. His life is all about efficiency and he's excellent at making decisions and accomplishing tasks in 3 minutes. Kids are at the top of Scott's list of "the most disgusting things on Earth".  When his wallet is stolen during a rehearsal of a wedding gown show, Scott believes that a six-year-old child named Wayne is the culprit. The child then suddenly calls him "Dad".

Cast
 Ronald Cheng - Scott Chong
 Cherrie Ying - Wayne's Aunt
 Teresa Mo - Joe (or wayne calls her "Big Sister Joe")
 Theresa Fu - Frankie's girlfriend
 Au Ka-Hing - Wayne Chong, Scott's unknown biological son  
 Richard Ng - Scott's father
 Gordon Liu - Mahjong debt collector
 Benz Hui - Li Takmi
 Lawrence Ng - Frankie Tam Kwong Yuen
 Min Hun Fung

External links

 Hong Kong Cinemagic entry
 loveHKfilm entry

2006 films
Hong Kong comedy films
2000s Cantonese-language films
Films directed by Gordon Chan
2000s Hong Kong films